Bret Garnett (born July 2, 1967, in Honolulu, Hawaii), is a former professional tennis player from the United States.  

Garnett enjoyed most of his tennis success while playing doubles.  During his career he won 1 doubles title.  He achieved a career-high doubles ranking of World No. 49 in 1993.

Garnett's highest singles ranking was World No. 203 which he reached April, 1989.

Garnett played college tennis at the University of Southwestern Louisiana.  He and his wife Cheryl resided in Camden, South Carolina during Bret's tour days.

ATP career finals

Doubles: 4 (1 title, 3 runner-ups)

ATP Challenger and ITF Futures finals

Doubles: 5 (3–2)

Performance timelines

Singles

Doubles

Mixed doubles

External links
 
 

1967 births
Living people
American male tennis players
Louisiana Ragin' Cajuns men's tennis players
Sportspeople from Honolulu
People from Camden, South Carolina
Tennis people from Hawaii
Tennis people from South Carolina